Waharoa is a rural community in the Waikato region of New Zealand's North Island. It is located 7 km north of Matamata, and is part of the Matamata-Piako District. It is located at the junction of the Kinleith Branch railway and the East Coast Main Trunk Railway. State Highway 27 runs through the town, which is serviced by several shops and cafes and by a petrol station.

Also to the north, near the airport, are the community of Tamihana (where the Raungaiti marae is located)  and remnants of the original Matamata pā. To the east lie the communities of Wardville and Turanga-o-moana, to the west the community of Walton, and to the south the town of Matamata.

History

Early history

Prior to colonisation, the area surrounding and including present-day Waharoa was held by Ngāti Hauā. In 1830, the Ngāti Hauā chief Te Waharoa established the Matamata pā a few kilometers north of the current settlement.

Reverend Alfred Nesbit Brown first visited the area in 1833, and founded the nearby Matamata Mission Station in 1835. A year later, it was abandoned because of a war that broke out between Ngāti Hauā and neighbouring tribes. In 1841, a Catholic mission was established nearby, but by 1844 it had moved to Rangiaowhia.

In 1865, Josiah Firth began buying up land in the surrounding area from Te Waharoa's son, Wiremu Tamihana. Firth gradually converted the land to freehold sections. This area began to be called the Matamata estate. Today, a portion of that area is the settlement of Waharoa.

Establishment 

Firth built the township of Waharoa in 1886 around what was then a new railway station, Waharoa Station. He established a church, a school, and a dairy factory and divided the land into ¼-acre sections.

In 1921, a butter factory was built in the town. Another local industry was flax production: The town by this time also had a flax mill. St Davids Presbyterian Church was dedicated on Sunday 18 October 1925. Meeting halls were built in 1916 and 1954.

Railway station 
Waharoa had a flag station opposite Pitt St on the Kinleith Branch from 8 March 1886, opened from Morrinsville to Tīrau (then called Oxford) on Monday 8 March 1886 by the Thames Valley & Rotorua Railway Co. New Zealand Railways Department took over the line on 1 April 1886. Another state house was added in 1955. There was a Post Office at the station, run by ganger, from 1893 to 1900. By 1896 a platform, cart approach, loading bank, sheep yards and a passing loop for 33 wagons had been added. The loop had been extended to 40 by 1899 and 62 by 1964. The station was rebuilt in 1923, had a verandah added in 1924 and closed to passengers on 12 November 1968 and to freight, other than private siding traffic, on 29 March 1981. There is now only a passing loop at the station site and a siding. There was a siding to the Waikato Co-op Dairy from 1925 until the Anchor dairy factory closed in 1995 and was demolished in 2005. Icepak still has a private siding.

Marae

The community of Waharoa is very close, with most people belonging to the Ngāti Hauā iwi.

The local Raungaiti Marae is affiliated with the Ngāti Hauā hapū of Ngāti Rangi Tawhaki and Ngāti Te Oro, and with the iwi of Waikato Tainui. It includes Te Oro meeting house.

In October 2020, the Government committed $734,311 from the Provincial Growth Fund to upgrade the marae and 4 other Ngāti Hauā marae, creating 7 jobs.

Demographics 
Waharoa is part of the larger Waharoa-Peria statistical area.

Waharoa had a population of 630 at the 2018 New Zealand census, an increase of 156 people (32.9%) since the 2013 census, and an increase of 111 people (21.4%) since the 2006 census. There were 147 households, comprising 321 males and 309 females, giving a sex ratio of 1.04 males per female, with 183 people (29.0%) aged under 15 years, 156 (24.8%) aged 15 to 29, 252 (40.0%) aged 30 to 64, and 36 (5.7%) aged 65 or older.

Ethnicities were 34.8% European/Pākehā, 75.2% Māori, 4.3% Pacific peoples, 2.9% Asian, and 0.0% other ethnicities. People may identify with more than one ethnicity.

Although some people chose not to answer the census's question about religious affiliation, 52.9% had no religion, 35.2% were Christian, 1.9% had Māori religious beliefs, 1.4% were Hindu, 0.5% were Muslim and 1.9% had other religions.

Of those at least 15 years old, 27 (6.0%) people had a bachelor's or higher degree, and 150 (33.6%) people had no formal qualifications. 24 people (5.4%) earned over $70,000 compared to 17.2% nationally. The employment status of those at least 15 was that 219 (49.0%) people were employed full-time, 60 (13.4%) were part-time, and 66 (14.8%) were unemployed.

Waharoa-Peria statistical area

Waharoa-Peria had a population of 1,521 at the 2018 New Zealand census, an increase of 258 people (20.4%) since the 2013 census, and an increase of 207 people (15.8%) since the 2006 census. There were 471 households, comprising 771 males and 747 females, giving a sex ratio of 1.03 males per female. The median age was 35.9 years (compared with 37.4 years nationally), with 360 people (23.7%) aged under 15 years, 309 (20.3%) aged 15 to 29, 702 (46.2%) aged 30 to 64, and 150 (9.9%) aged 65 or older.

Ethnicities were 67.7% European/Pākehā, 36.3% Māori, 2.6% Pacific peoples, 4.1% Asian, and 1.0% other ethnicities. People may identify with more than one ethnicity.

The percentage of people born overseas was 11.0, compared with 27.1% nationally.

Although some people chose not to answer the census's question about religious affiliation, 50.1% had no religion, 37.1% were Christian, 0.8% had Māori religious beliefs, 1.4% were Hindu, 0.2% were Muslim, 0.2% were Buddhist and 1.6% had other religions.

Of those at least 15 years old, 141 (12.1%) people had a bachelor's or higher degree, and 297 (25.6%) people had no formal qualifications. The median income was $35,200, compared with $31,800 nationally. 186 people (16.0%) earned over $70,000 compared to 17.2% nationally. The employment status of those at least 15 was that 642 (55.3%) people were employed full-time, 192 (16.5%) were part-time, and 84 (7.2%) were unemployed.

Education

Te Kura o Waharoa is the township's state primary school, teaching Year 1 to 6 students in the Māori language. It opened in 1887, with the current buildings dating from 1949, 1957, 1965 and 1967.

See also
 List of towns in New Zealand

References

Populated places in Waikato
Matamata-Piako District